Barrow Haven Reedbeds is a local nature reserve with an area of over  located in Barrow-upon-Humber, North Lincolnshire, England. 

It is one of the most important of the flooded former clay pits on the Humber bank: Over 150 species of birds have been recorded from the site.

References

Local Nature Reserves in Lincolnshire
Tourist attractions in Lincolnshire
Lincolnshire Wildlife Trust